This list of flagpoles by height includes completed flagpoles which are either free–standing or supported, excluding the height of any pedestal (plinth), building, or other base platform which may elevate them.

See also 
 List of tallest bridges
 List of tallest buildings
 List of tallest structures

References

Further reading 

 Hartvingsen, John M. (2012). "Utah’s Mammoth Statehood Flag". Raven: A Journal of Vexillology. 19: pp. 28, 41-43

Flagpoles
Flagpoles